The politics of Trinidad and Tobago function within the framework of a unitary state regulated by a parliamentary democracy modelled on that of the United Kingdom of Great Britain and Northern Ireland, from which the country gained its independence in 1962. Under the 1976 republican Constitution, the monarch was replaced as head of state by a President chosen by an electoral college composed of the members of the bicameral Parliament, consisting of the Senate and the House of Representatives.

The country has remained a member of the Commonwealth, and has retained the Judicial Committee of the Privy Council in London as its highest court of appeal. The general direction and control of the government rests with the Cabinet, led by a Prime Minister. The Prime Minister and Cabinet are answerable to the House of Representatives. The 41 members of the House are elected to terms of at least five years. Elections may be called earlier by the president at the request of the prime minister or after a vote of no confidence in the House of Representatives. In 1976, the voting age was reduced from 21 to 18. The Senate's 31 members are appointed by the President: 16 on the advice of the prime minister, six on the advice of the leader of the opposition, and nine independents selected by the President from among outstanding members of the community. Local government is through nine Regional Corporations and five municipalities. Tobago was given a measure of self-government in 1980 and is governed by the Tobago House of Assembly. In 1996, Parliament passed legislation which gave Tobago greater self-government. In 2005 Parliament approved a proposal by the independent Elections and Boundaries Commission to increase the number of seats in the House of Representatives from 36 to 41.

Party politics has generally run along ethnic lines, with most Afro-Trinidadians supporting the People's National Movement (PNM) and most Indo-Trinidadians supporting various Indian-majority parties, such as the current United National Congress (UNC) or its predecessors. Most political parties, however, have sought to broaden their purview. In the run-up to the 2007 general election, a new political presence emerged called Congress of The People (COP). Led by Winston Dookeran, the majority of this membership was formed from former UNC members. Despite gaining a significant but minority share of the vote in various constituencies, the COP failed to capture a single seat.

An early general election was called on 16 April 2010, and was held on 24 May 2010. Two major entities contested the election: the incumbent PNM, and a coalition called the People's Partnership, led by UNC leader Kamla Persad-Bissessar, comprising the UNC, COP, Tobago Organisation of the People (TOP), and two labour and non-governmental organisations: the National Joint Action Committee and the Movement for Social Justice. The People's Partnership won 29 seats and the majority, with Kamla Persad-Bissessar being sworn in as the country's first female Prime Minister on 26 May 2010. The PNM won the remaining 12 seats and comprised the opposition in parliament.

After the period a new party also emerged from an ex-member of the United National Congress, known as the Independent Liberal Party which was founded by FIFA ex-vice president Jack Warner.

In the 2015 general election resulted in a victory for the People's National Movement, which won 23 of the 41 seats led by Keith Rowley. In August 2020,  Prime Minister Keith Rowley’s  ruling party PNM won the general election again.

Executive branch

| President
|   
 Paula-Mae Weekes
| Independent
| 19 March 2018
|-
|Prime Minister
| 
 Keith Rowley
|People's National Movement
|9 September 2015 
|}
The President is elected by an electoral college, which consists of the members of the Senate and House of Representatives, for a five-year term. The Prime Minister is appointed by the President from among the members of Parliament; following legislative elections, the person with the most support among the elected members of the House of Representatives is appointed Prime Minister, usually the leader of the winning party. The cabinet is appointed from among the Members of Parliament, which constitutes elected Members of the House of Representatives and appointed Members of the Senate

Cabinet ministers of Trinidad and Tobago

Prime Minister: Keith Rowley
Minister of Finance: Colm Imbert
Attorney-General: Reginald Armour
Minister of National Security: Fitzgerald Hinds
Minister of Foreign and CARICOM Affairs: Amery Browne
Minister of Planning and Sustainable Development: Pennelope Beckles
Minister of Trade and Industry: Paula Gopee-Scoon
Minister of Energy and Energy Industries: Stuart Young
Minister of Tourism, Culture and the Arts: Randall Mitchell
Minister of Local Government and Rural Development: Faris Al Rawi 
Minister of Agriculture, Lands and Fisheries: Kazim Hosein
Minister of Housing and Urban Development: Camille Robinson-Regis
Minister of Works and Transport: Rohan Sinanan
Minister of Public Utilities: Marvin Gonzales
Minister of Public Administration and Digital Transformation: Allyson West
Minister of Health: Terrence Deyalsingh
Minister of Education: Nyan Gadsby-Dolly
Minister of Labour and Small Enterprise Development:  Stephen McClashie
Minister of Social Development and Family Services: Donna Cox
Minister of Sports and Community Development: Shamfa Cudjoe
Minister of Youth Development and National Services: Foster Cummings
Minister in the Office of the Prime Minister: Stuart Young
Minister in the Office of the Prime Minister: Ayanna Webster-Roy
Minister in the Office of the Prime Minister: Symon De Nobrega
Minister in the Ministry of Finance: Brian Manning
Minister in the Office of the Attorney-General: Renuka Sagramsingh-Sooklal
Minister in the Ministry of Agriculture, Lands and Fisheries: Avinash Singh
Minister in the Ministry of Agriculture, Lands and Fisheries (Lands): Nigel de Freitas
Minister in the Ministry of Housing and Urban Development: Adrian Leonce
Minister in the Ministry of Education: Lisa Morris-Julian
Minister in the Ministry of Public Administration: Hassel Bacchus
Following the 2015 general elections, a number of ministries were removed, while others were consolidated or reintroduced.

Legislative branch

The Parliament of the Republic of Trinidad and Tobago has two chambers. The House of Representatives has 41 members, elected for a five-year term in single-seat constituencies. The Senate has 31 members: 16 Government Senators appointed on the advice of the Prime Minister, six Opposition Senators appointed on the advice of the Leader of the Opposition and nine Independent Senators appointed by the President to represent other sectors of civil society. The 15 member Tobago House of Assembly has limited autonomy with respect to Tobago.

Party division by Parliamentary session
The following tables lists the party divisions for the House of Representatives and Tobago House of Assembly. Note that numbers in boldface denote the majority party at that particular time while italicized numbers signify a House in which the majority party changed intra-term.

Tobago House of Assembly

Partisan control of Parliament 
This table shows the number of Parliaments in which a party controlled the House of Representatives and Tobago House of Assembly.

Tobago House of Assembly

Judicial branch

The country's highest court is the Court of Appeal of Trinidad and Tobago, whose chief justice is appointed by the president after consultation with the Prime Minister and Leader of the Opposition. The current Chief Justice of Trinidad and Tobago is Ivor Archie.  Final appeal on some matters is decided by the Judicial Committee of the Privy Council in London. Trinidad and Tobago was chosen by its Caribbean neighbours (Caricom) to be the headquarters site of the Caribbean Court of Justice (CCJ) which was supposed to replace the Judicial Committee of the Privy Council in the fall of 2003.  However, the government has been unable to pass legislation to effect this change.

Administrative divisions

Trinidad is divided in five Municipalities Arima, Chaguanas, Port of Spain, Point Fortin, San Fernando and nine Regional Corporations Couva–Tabaquite–Talparo, Diego Martin, Penal–Debe, Princes Town, Mayaro–Rio Claro, San Juan–Laventille, Sangre Grande, Siparia, and Tunapuna–Piarco.

Local government in Tobago is handled by the Tobago House of Assembly.

International organization participation
ACP, C, Caricom, CDB, ECLAC, FAO, G-24, G-77, IADB, IBRD, ICAO, ICCt, ICRM, IDA, IFAD, IFC, IFRCS, IHO, ILO, IMF, IMO, Intelsat, Interpol, IOC, ISO, ITU, ITUC, LAES, NAM, OAS, OPANAL, OPCW, UN, UNCTAD, UNESCO, UNIDO, UNU, UPU, WCO, WFTU, WHO, WIPO, WMO, WTrO

References

External links

The Elections and Boundaries Commission (EB&C), Trinidad and Tobago